This is a list of French television related events from 1999.

Events
2 March - Nayah is selected to represent France at the 1999 Eurovision Song Contest with her song "Je veux donner ma voix". She is selected to be the forty-second French Eurovision entry during a national final held at the Olympia in Paris.

Debuts
11 October - Un gars, une fille (1999-2003) (France 2)
Les Monos (1999-2004) (France 2)

International
20 December - // Rayman: The Animated Series (1999-2000) (Gulli)
 Thomas the Tank Engine & Friends (1984-present) (Cartoon Network)

Television shows

1940s
Le Jour du Seigneur (1949–present)

1950s
Présence protestante (1955-)

1970s
30 millions d'amis (1976-2016)

1990s
Sous le soleil (1996-2008)
Cap des Pins (1998-2000)

Ending this year

Births

Deaths

See also
1999 in France